Kofi Nahaje Sarkodie-Mensah (born August 14, 1981) is a Ghanaian-born American professional wrestler. He is currently signed to WWE, where he performs on the SmackDown brand under the ring name Kofi Kingston.

After graduating from Boston College, he decided to pursue a professional wrestling career, and began performing on the New England independent circuit as a Jamaican wrestler by the name of Kofi Nahaje Kingston. After signing a developmental deal with WWE in 2006, he shortened his ring name to Kofi Kingston. He debuted in WWE in 2008 using the same Jamaican character as he did on the independent circuit. In late 2009, he stopped being billed from Jamaica and dropped the accent, although he kept his ring name. He then started being billed from his home country of Ghana.

From 2008 to 2013, Kingston became a four-time Intercontinental Champion, a three-time United States Champion, and a one-time World Tag Team Champion with CM Punk. In 2014, he formed The New Day with Big E and Xavier Woods. The trio went on to break the record for the longest tag team championship reign in WWE history when they held the WWE (Raw) Tag Team Championship from August 2015 to December 2016, defending the titles under the Freebird rule. All totaled, Kingston is a 15-time tag team champion in WWE. In April 2019, Kingston defeated Daniel Bryan at WrestleMania 35 to win the WWE Championship, giving him 23 total championships in WWE.

He is the first, and currently only, African-born world champion in WWE history. His WWE Championship win also made him WWE's 30th Triple Crown Champion and 20th overall Grand Slam Champion (13th under the current format). With his NXT Tag Team Championship win in 2022,  Kingston also became a Tag Team Triple Crown Champion, becoming the only wrestler to have won both the traditional and tag team version of the WWE Triple Crown, as well as having the most overall reigns with a WWE-branded tag team championship with 15. With the exception of a few months spent as a villain in 2015 with The New Day, Sarkodie-Mensah has been a heroic character for almost the entirety of his WWE career. Sarkodie-Mensah has also gotten some distinction through his numerous methods of avoiding elimination during the Royal Rumble.

Early life
Kofi Nahaje Sarkodie-Mensah was born in Kumasi, Ashanti on August 14, 1981 to Kwasi and Elizabeth Sarkodie-Mensah. He has a brother, Kwame (who is a Twitch streamer under the name of Temp0), and a late sister, Nana Akua. He moved with his family to the United States and eventually settled in the greater Boston area, where he graduated from Winchester High School in Winchester, Massachusetts and then Boston College.

Professional wrestling career

Training and independent circuit (2005–2006) 
Sarkodie-Mensah started training in late 2005 and made his official wrestling debut in 2006 for Chaotic Wrestling, when he faced Evan Siks on June 4 for the PWF Mayhem Heavyweight Championship in a losing effort. He competed primarily in the New England area, including stints in National Wrestling Alliance (NWA) – New England (where he was briefly a member of Barry Ace's "A-List"), Millennium Wrestling Federation (MWF), New England Championship Wrestling (NECW), the Eastern Wrestling Alliance (EWA), and Chaotic Wrestling.

World Wrestling Entertainment/WWE

Developmental territories (2006–2007) 
In September 2006, he signed a developmental contract with World Wrestling Entertainment (WWE) and was assigned to Deep South Wrestling (DSW), a Georgia-based developmental federation. He debuted in the new company, as Kofi Nahaje Kingston, in a dark match loss to Montel Vontavious Porter on September 21. For the rest of 2006 and the beginning of 2007, he appeared in DSW, as well as its Kentucky-based sister promotion Ohio Valley Wrestling (OVW), where he was in a tag team dubbed the Commonwealth Connection with Harry Smith.

In 2007, under the ring name Kofi Nahaje Kingston, he had his first exposure to the main WWE roster, when he worked dark matches on March 5 and 26 before episodes of Raw against Charlie Haas and Trevor Murdoch, respectively. When he returned to the developmental federations, he shortened his original ring name to Kofi Kingston and continued to alternate between both ring names throughout his duration there. He also worked live events, defeating Shelton Benjamin on May 5, and Val Venis on May 6. When the Florida-based developmental territory Florida Championship Wrestling (FCW) opened in June, Kingston was relocated there, appearing at their inaugural show on June 26 where he teamed with Eric Pérez against Keith Walker and Rycklon Stephens in a losing effort. Kingston worked there for most of the remainder of the year.

Debut and Feud with Randy Orton (2007–2009) 

A series of vignettes for Kingston's television debut began airing on the weekly ECW on Syfy television show starting on December 6, 2007. During this introduction phase, his videos, the official website and commentators noted he would be the first Jamaican to wrestle for WWE but he does not have any Jamaican ancestry, nor any connection to Jamaica. He is, however, the first African-born performer in WWE history. He debuted on the January 22, 2008 ECW as a face with a win over local wrestler David Owen in Charlottesville, Virginia. After wrestling sporadic matches, Kingston was involved in his first major match, a 24-man battle royal during the WrestleMania XXIV pre-show with the winner receiving an ECW Championship match, but was eliminated by Mark Henry. Kingston remained undefeated in singles competition in ECW for months and was placed into a feud with Shelton Benjamin at the end of April 2008. After two straight losses, Benjamin got a win over Kingston on the May 20 ECW, ending his undefeated streak. On the June 24 ECW, Kingston defeated Benjamin in an Extreme Rules match to end their feud.

On June 25, 2008, Kingston was drafted to the Raw brand, as part of the WWE Supplemental Draft. In his first match as a member of Raw roster, and first championship match in WWE, he defeated Chris Jericho for the Intercontinental Championship at Night of Champions, after Shawn Michaels, whom Jericho was feuding with, attacked Jericho's manager Lance Cade. The win made him the first African-born wrestler to hold a championship in World Wrestling Entertainment. Kingston held the championship until SummerSlam, where he and Women's Champion Mickie James both lost their championships in an intergender "winner take all" tag team match to Santino Marella and Beth Phoenix.

At Unforgiven, he appeared backstage, coming to the aid of then-World Heavyweight Champion CM Punk, who had been attacked by Randy Orton, Manu, and the World Tag Team Champions Cody Rhodes and Ted DiBiase. Soon after coming to his rescue, Kingston and Punk were paired together more often, and on the October 27 episode of Raw, the duo won the World Tag Team Championship. He was also involved at Survivor Series in the traditional ten-men elimination tag team match on the side of Team Batista, but was eliminated by Randy Orton. Kingston and Punk lost the World Tag Team Championship to John Morrison and The Miz at a live event on December 13. When asked about his reign with Punk, he stated that "Punk took him under his wing when he didn’t have to and he was always grateful for that friendship". At No Way Out on February 15, 2009, Kingston was scheduled to compete in the World Heavyweight Championship Elimination Chamber match but was unable to officially enter the match as he was ambushed by Edge, who took Kingston's place and eventually won the match. On the March 9 episode of Raw, Kingston defeated Chris Jericho after interference from Ric Flair, to earn a spot in the Money in the Bank ladder match at WrestleMania 25, but the match was won by CM Punk. 

After winning a triple threat number one contender's match the week before, Kingston defeated Montel Vontavious Porter (MVP) on the June 1 episode of Raw to win the United States Championship for the first time. For the next several months, he went on to defend and retain the title at Extreme Rules, Night of Champions, Breaking Point, and Hell in a Cell, and on several episodes of Raw, until losing the championship to The Miz on the October 5 episode of Raw, ending his reign at 126 days.

Intercontinental Champion (2009–2011) 

On the October 19 episode of Raw, Kingston spoke without a Jamaican accent during a televised segment, dropped the Jamaican character and began being billed from his home country of Ghana. At Bragging Rights, Kingston wrestled as part of the Team Raw, which lost the match after Raw teammate Big Show betrayed them by chokeslamming Kingston, allowing Chris Jericho to pin Kingston to pick up the win for Team SmackDown. After Kingston interfered in a match between Randy Orton and John Cena for Cena's WWE Championship match, Orton and Kingston feuded, including a 5-men Survivor Series team against each other where Kingston's team won after he was the sole survivor, last eliminating Orton. and TLC: Tables, Ladders & Chairs, where Orton defeated Kingston. They also participated in a triple threat match which included John Cena to determined a challenger for the WWE Championship at the Royal Rumble, which was won by Orton, who pinned Kingston. He competed in the Elimination Chamber match for the WWE Championship at Elimination Chamber, but was eliminated by the champion Sheamus. At WrestleMania XXVI, Kingston was unsuccessful as the Money in the Bank match, which was won by Jack Swagger.

On the April 26 episode of Raw, Kingston was drafted to the SmackDown brand as part of the WWE draft. He would win a tournament for the vacant Intercontinental Championship on the May 14 episode of SmackDown. However, moments later, the title win was reversed when the title was returned to the previous champion Drew McIntyre. Kingston would defeat McIntyre for the title at Over the Limit, and retained in a rematch at Fatal 4-Way. On July 18 at Money in the Bank, Kingston lost the SmackDown Money in the Bank ladder match when Kane grabbed the briefcase. His Intercontinental reign would end on the August 6 episode of SmackDown, where he lost it against Dolph Ziggler. Kingston would have 3 title rematches at SummerSlam, Smackdown, and Night of Champions, but he didn't win the title.

 On the October 15 episode of SmackDown, Kingston defeated Drew McIntyre to earn a spot on Team SmackDown at Bragging Rights. At Bragging Rights, Team SmackDown defeated Team Raw. On the December 3 episode of SmackDown, Kingston defeated Jack Swagger to become the number one contender for the Intercontinental Championship, but failed to win back the title when Swagger attacked him during the match. At TLC: Tables, Ladders & Chairs, Kingston competed in a triple threat ladder match for the Intercontinental Championship, which was won again by Ziggler. On the January 7, 2011 episode of SmackDown, Kingston defeated Ziggler to become the Intercontinental Champion for a third time. Immediately following the match, acting General Manager Vickie Guerrero ordered that Ziggler invoke his rematch clause straight away, but Kingston quickly pinned Ziggler again to retain his championship. Kingston then moved into a feud with Alberto Del Rio, which culminated in a non-title match at Elimination Chamber, which Kingston lost. On the March 25 episode of SmackDown, Kingston lost the Intercontinental Championship to Wade Barrett. On the April 1 episode of SmackDown, Kingston won his rematch against Wade Barrett by disqualification. At WrestleMania XXVII, after Vladimir Kozlov was injured at the hands of The Corre, Kingston was chosen as Kozlov's replacement in an eight-man tag team match involving Kingston, Kane, Big Show, and Santino Marella versus The Corre, which Kingston's team won.

On April 26, Kingston was drafted back to the Raw brand as part of the 2011 Supplemental Draft. At Extreme Rules, Kingston defeated Sheamus in a Tables match to win his second United States Championship. On the May 9 episode of Raw, Kingston successfully defended his championship against Jack Swagger. At Capitol Punishment, Kingston lost the title to Dolph Ziggler. Kingston faced Ziggler in a rematch for the title on the June 20 episode of Raw in a 2-out-of-3 falls match, but Ziggler retained the championship as the match ended with Ziggler being disqualified.

Air Boom and teaming with R-Truth (2011–2012) 

On the August 22 episode Raw, Kingston won the WWE Tag Team Championship with Evan Bourne, when they defeated David Otunga and Michael McGillicutty. On the August 29 Raw, the duo was called "Air Boom", and they had their first successful title defense when they defeated Otunga and McGillicutty in a rematch. At Night of Champions, Air Boom retained their titles against The Miz and R-Truth by disqualification after Miz attacked a WWE referee. At Hell in a Cell and Vengeance, Air Boom retained their titles twice against Dolph Ziggler and Jack Swagger. Bourne was suspended throughout November for his first violation of the company's Wellness policy. 

At TLC: Tables, Ladders & Chairs Air Boom successfully retained their titles against Primo & Epico. On January 15, 2012, Air Boom lost the Tag Team titles to Primo and Epico at a house show. The following night on Raw, Air Boom were awarded a rematch but failed to regain the titles. The following day, Bourne was suspended again for his second violation of WWE's Wellness Policy.

At Royal Rumble, Kingston participated in the Royal Rumble match and although he did not win, he had a stand-out moment when he saved himself from elimination by walking on his hands to reach the ring steps and re-enter the ring. At Elimination Chamber, Kingston failed to capture the WWE Championship after being eliminated third by Chris Jericho. Kingston then began teaming with R-Truth. On the February 27 Raw, Kingston and Truth failed to capture the WWE Tag Team Championship from Primo and Epico in a Triple Threat Tag Team Match, also involving Ziggler and Swagger. On the April 30 Raw, Kingston and Truth defeated Primo and Epico to win the WWE Tag Team Championship. At Over the Limit, Kingston and R-Truth successfully defended the titles against Dolph Ziggler and Jack Swagger and then again in a rematch on the May 28  Raw.

The following night on Raw, they successfully defended the WWE Tag Team Championship against The Prime Time Players (Titus O'Neil and Darren Young). At SummerSlam, Kingston and Truth defeated the Prime Time Players to retain the WWE Tag Team Championship. At Night of Champions, Kingston and Truth lost the Tag Team Championship to the team of Daniel Bryan and Kane and failed to regain the titles from the new champions the following night on Raw. Both Kingston and Truth were defeated by The Prime Time Players in the first round of the Tag Team Tournament to determine the number one contenders for the Tag Team Championships, causing both Kingston and Truth to disband as a team and each returning to being single competitors.

United States Champion (2012–2014) 

On the October 17 episode of Main Event, Kingston defeated The Miz to win the Intercontinental Championship for the fourth time in his career. Kingston then began feuding with Wade Barrett, when the two were placed on opposing teams in the traditional five-on-five elimination tag team match on November 18 at Survivor Series. Kingston's team, led by Mick Foley, was defeated by Barrett's team, led by Dolph Ziggler, during which he was eliminated by Barrett. The following night on Raw, Kingston was defeated by Barrett in a non-title match. Kingston, still the Intercontinental Champion, received a shot at the United States Championship on the December 3 episode of Raw against Barrett, R-Truth, and the champion Antonio Cesaro in a fatal four-way match, but was unsuccessful after Cesaro pinned Kingston for the win. At TLC: Tables, Ladders & Chairs, Kingston successfully defended his title against Barrett. Two weeks later on the December 31 episode of Raw, Kingston lost the Intercontinental Championship to Barrett, ending his reign at 74 days. Kingston received his rematch four days later on SmackDown, but lost the match. On January 27, 2013, at the Royal Rumble, Kingston participated in the Royal Rumble match, and after eliminating Tensai, he was pushed out of the ring, but Kingston jumped on Tensai's back, landed on the announce table and used a commentary chair from John "Bradshaw" Layfield to hop to the ring apron, before being eliminated by Cody Rhodes.

On the April 15 episode of Raw, Kingston defeated Antonio Cesaro to win his third United States Championship but lost it on May 19 at Extreme Rules to Dean Ambrose. On the May 31 episode of SmackDown, Kingston was written out of television, as he was undergoing elbow surgery and was expected to be out for four to eight weeks. Kingston returned from injury on the August 5 episode of Raw, defeating Fandango. At Night of Champions, Kingston faced Curtis Axel for the Intercontinental Championship, but was defeated. In the following weeks, Bray Wyatt would start delivering cryptic messages to Kingston after his matches, leading to a match between the two at Battleground, which Wyatt won. On the November 18 episode of Raw, Kingston teamed with The Miz to face The Real Americans (Antonio Cesaro and Jack Swagger), but they lost after Miz turned on Kingston. This led to a match at Survivor Series, where Kingston was defeated by The Miz. In the upcoming weeks, the feud continued and culminated in a no disqualification match between the two at TLC: Tables, Ladders & Chairs, which Kingston won.

At the Royal Rumble on January 26, 2014, Kingston participated in the Royal Rumble match, where he avoided elimination by landing on the crowd barricade and made an 11-foot jump to get back in the ring, but he was later eliminated by Roman Reigns. At WrestleMania XXX, Kingston competed in the André the Giant Memorial Battle Royal, where he would have a standout moment in the match, getting thrown of over the turnbuckles by Cesaro and to avoid elimination by keeping his toes on the steel steps, he would later be eliminated by Sheamus. At Battleground, Kingston competed in the Battle Royal for the Intercontinental Championship, but failed to win the match.

Formation of The New Day (2014–2018) 

During the summer of 2014, Kingston was put in a team with Big E, and Xavier Woods usually as manager. In November, WWE began airing vignettes for Kingston, Woods and Big E, with the stable now being billed as The New Day. The New Day made their in-ring debut on the November 28 episode of SmackDown in a winning effort against Curtis Axel, Heath Slater and Titus O'Neil. They started a brief feud with Gold and Stardust, which Kingston and Big E defeated Gold and Stardust at the TLC: Tables, Ladders & Chairs pre-show on December 14. At the WrestleMania 31 pre-show on March 29, 2015, they failed to win the WWE Tag Team Championship in a fatal four-way match as well as being eliminated by Big Show in the Andre the Giant Memorial Battle Royal.

On the April 6 episode of Raw, The New Day turned heel, which would mark Kingston's first heel turn in WWE ever since debuting in 2008. At Extreme Rules, Kingston and Big E defeated Tyson Kidd and Cesaro to win the WWE Tag Team Championships. At Payback, The New Day defeated Kidd and Cesaro to retain their titles. At Elimination Chamber, The New Day defeated Kidd and Cesaro, The Lucha Dragons, The Ascension, Los Matadores, and the Prime Time Players to retain their titles in the first ever tag team Elimination Chamber match;  all three members were allowed to compete in a pre-match stipulation. However, they lost the titles at Money in the Bank against The Prime Time Players. However, they would regain the titles at SummerSlam. The following night on Raw, The Dudley Boyz made their WWE return and attacked the New Day with Woods being put through a table with the 3D. New Day lost to the Dudley Boyz via disqualification at Night of Champions but retained their tag team titles. The next month, at Hell in a Cell, they defeated the Dudley Boyz to retain their titles. At TLC, The New Day retained the title against The Usos and The Lucha Dragons in a Triple threat tag team ladder match. The New Day retained the titles at Royal Rumble against The Usos.

At Fastlane, The New Day turned face by mocking The League of Nations, starting a feud. They retained their titles at Roadblock against The League of Nations. At WrestleMania 32, The New Day were defeated by The League of Nations in a six-man tag team match. The following night on Raw, they successfully retained their title against The League of Nations, ending their feud. After WrestleMania, they retained their title at Extreme Rules against The Vaudevillains, and at Money in the Bank against Gallows and Anderson, The Vaudevillains and Enzo Amore and Big Cass in a Fatal-4 Way Tag Team match.

On July 19 at the 2016 WWE draft, Kingston, along with his fellow The New Day teammates, was drafted to Raw. Three days later, on July 22, Kingston, along with Big E and Xavier Woods, became the longest reigning WWE Tag Team Champions in history, breaking the record of 331 days previously set by Paul London and Brian Kendrick. After SmackDown established the SmackDown Tag Team Championship after the brand split, the titles held by The New Day were renamed the Raw Tag Team Championship. They would retain the titles against Gallows and Anderson at SummerSlam and Clash of Champions. Their reign ended at Roadblock: End of the Line, where they lost the title to Cesaro and Sheamus, thus ending their record breaking championship reign at 483 days.

On January 29, 2017, Kingston participated the Royal Rumble match in which he was standing on the top-rope when Baron Corbin tried to push him backwards to eliminate him from the match. Instead, he fell directly behind the ring post, grabbed on to the top rope of it and managed to hang on. The New Day were revealed to be the hosts of WrestleMania 33. The night after WrestleMania on Raw, The New Day issued an open challenge to any team which was accepted by The Revival, who were moved up from NXT, and lost to them. After the match, Revival attacked Kofi Kingston. On April 10, it was announced that Kingston had suffered an ankle injury due to the attack of Revival which would require surgery.

On April 11, 2017, The New Day were moved to the SmackDown brand as part of the Superstar Shake-up. The New Day debuted on "Talking Smack", the post-show for SmackDown Live on May 23, however, they did not wrestle or make an appearance on SmackDown Live itself due to Kingston's injury. The New Day made their official return on May 30 episode of SmackDown Live, announcing their objective to defeat The Usos and win the SmackDown Tag Team Championship. The two teams faced off at Money in the Bank, where Big E and Kingston emerged victorious when The Usos purposely got themselves counted out, thus keeping their titles. A rematch took place at Battleground, where Kingston and Woods were successful in capturing the titles, thus making Kingston the first wrestler to hold the SmackDown Tag Team Championship, Raw Tag Team Championship (both its previous and current incarnations), and the original World Tag Team Championship. A month later at the SummerSlam pre-show, however, The New Day (represented by Big E and Woods) dropped the titles back to The Usos, ending their reign at 28 days. On September 12 at the episode promoted as Sin City SmackDown, Kingston and Big E represented New Day and defeated The Usos to win back the championship for their second reign in a "Sin City Street Fight", but lost them again to The Usos at Hell in a Cell. On the October 23 episode of Raw, The New Day along with other talent of SmackDown ambushed the Raw locker room. They again appeared on the November 6 episode of Raw in the crowd, which led to distraction of Seth Rollins and Dean Ambrose and costing them the tag titles. On the November 14 episode of SmackDown Live, The Shield led an attack with Raw Superstars and invaded SmackDown similar to the one led by SmackDown and attacked everyone including The New Day. At Survivor Series, The New Day was defeated by The Shield. The New Day failed to regain the titles from The Usos at Clash of Champions in a Fatal-4-Way tag team match also involving the team of Rusev and Aiden English, and Chad Gable and Shelton Benjamin.

At the Royal Rumble on January 28, 2018, Kingston entered the match as the 16th entrant, but was eliminated by Andrade "Cien" Almas. At Fastlane, The New Day faced The Usos for the Smackdown Tag Team Championships, but went to a no contest after inference from The Bludgeon Brothers. Two weeks later, it was confirmed that at WrestleMania 34, The New Day would face The Usos and The Bludgeon Brothers in a Triple Threat tag team match for the Smackdown Tag Team Championships. The New Day failed to capture the titles at the WrestleMania, which were won by The Bludgeon Brothers. On the April 11 episode of SmackDown Live, The New Day were defeated by The Usos in a match to determine which team would challenge The Bludgeon Brothers at the Greatest Royal Rumble event. The New Day competed in a tag team tournament, defeating Sanity in the first round, while The Bar (Cesaro and Sheamus) defeated The Usos. The New Day then defeated The Bar the following week on SmackDown Live to earn the right to face The Bludgeon Brothers at SummerSlam, where they won the match by disqualification, meaning The Bludgeon Brothers retained their titles. Two days later on SmackDown Live, however, The New Day defeated The Bludgeon Brothers in a no disqualification match to capture the titles for a third time. At Hell in a Cell, The New Day successfully defeated Rusev and Aiden English to retain the titles. A few weeks later on October 6, at Super Show-Down, The New Day again retained their titles by defeating The Bar. At SmackDown 1000, The New Day lost their titles against The Bar. They would fail to regain the titles at Crown Jewel event.

WWE Champion (2018–2019) 
Two weeks later, they made up part of Team SmackDown in a 5-on-5 tag-team elimination match at Survivor Series, in which they defeated Team Raw. At TLC: Tables, Ladders & Chairs, The New Day failed to win the championship from The Bar, in a triple-threat tag team match, also involving The Usos. At Royal Rumble, Kingston was eliminated by Drew McIntyre.

On the February 12 episode of SmackDown Live, Kingston was selected to replace Mustafa Ali in the WWE Championship Elimination Chamber match at the namesake pay–per–view after Ali suffered an injury. While Kingston lost the Elimination Chamber match against Bryan, his good performance during a one-hour gauntlet match at SmackDown and the Elimination Chamber translated in a huge support by the public. The following months, Kingston was involved in a storyline during the road to WrestleMania, known as KofiMania, where he tried to win the WWE Championship, but Mr. McMahon put obstacles. At Fastlane, Kingston was apparently granted a title match by McMahon, but it was instead a handicap match against The Bar, which Kingston subsequently lost. After Fastlane, Mr. McMahon told Kingston he would earn a WWE Championship match at WrestleMania if he beat Sheamus, Cesaro, Rowan, Samoa Joe, and Randy Orton in another gauntlet match, but after Kingston succeeded in beating the five men, McMahon inserted Daniel Bryan in the match who would defeat him. In what was the last chance for Kingston, McMahon announced a gauntlet match for Big E and Xavier Woods, who were able to defeat five other teams, including Bryan and Rowan to give Kingston his championship match against Bryan at WrestleMania 35. At WrestleMania, Kingston defeated Bryan and won the WWE Championship for the first time, becoming the first African-born WWE Champion in history, as well as WWE's 30th Triple Crown and 20th Grand Slam champion.

Kingston then successfully defended the title against Daniel Bryan on the May 6 episode of Raw, and against Kevin Owens at Money in the Bank. Kingston then started a feud with the returning Dolph Ziggler, retaining the title at Super ShowDown in a singles match and at Stomping Grounds in a steel cage match. At Extreme Rules, he retained the championship against Samoa Joe, while Big E and Woods won the SmackDown Tag Team Championship for a record-tying fourth time for New Day (which also technically made Kingston a double champion, as WWE counts all of New Day's Tag Team Championship reigns as individual reigns for all three members under the Freebird rule). At Smackville, he successfully defended the title against Dolph Ziggler and Samoa Joe in a triple threat match. Kingston defended his title against Randy Orton at SummerSlam, where the match ended in a double count out. The two had a rematch at Clash of Champions, where Kingston was victorious. On the September 17 episode of SmackDown Live, Brock Lesnar confronted Kingston and challenged him to a championship match on the October 4 episode of SmackDown, which Kingston accepted. At the 20th Anniversary of SmackDown on October 4, Lesnar defeated Kingston in 8 seconds to win the championship, ending Kingston's reign at 180 days.

Return to the tag team division (2019–present) 
After losing the title, Kingston returned to compete in tag team matches, where he teamed with Big E and Woods to defeat The O.C. (AJ Styles, Luke Gallows, and Karl Anderson) on the following week on SmackDown. At Crown Jewel, Kingston and Big E competed in a tag team turmoil match for the WWE Tag Team World Cup, but they failed to win the match. On the November 8 episode of SmackDown, Kingston and Big E defeated The Revival to win the SmackDown Tag Team Championship, becoming four-time champions as a team, and record fifth reign for The New Day as a stable. At TLC: Tables, Ladders & Chairs, Kingston and Big E successfully defended the titles against The Revival in a ladder match. On January 26, 2020, at the Royal Rumble, Kingston participated in the Royal Rumble match, but was eliminated by Brock Lesnar. At Super ShowDown, Kingston and Big E lost the championships against John Morrison and The Miz and failed to regain the titles at Elimination Chamber.

At WrestleMania 36, Kingston, who represented The New Day, failed to win the titles back from Morrison, who represented himself and Miz, in a triple threat ladder match, also involving Jimmy Uso, who represented The Usos. A rematch took place on the April 17 episode of SmackDown, where Big E, who represented The New Day, won the titles back from Miz, who represented himself and Morrison, in a triple threat match, also involving Jey Uso, who represented The Usos, and this makes The New Day six-time SmackDown Tag Team Champions. At The Horror Show at Extreme Rules on July 19, Kingston and Big E lost their titles to the team of Cesaro and Shinsuke Nakamura in a tables match after being powerbombed through two tables. while Kingston would suffer a legitimate back injury, thus being out for nearly three months.

On the October 9 episode of SmackDown, both Kingston and Woods returned from injury and defeated Cesaro and Nakamura, winning their seventh SmackDown Tag Team Championship. After the match, as part of the 2020 Draft, Kingston and Woods were drafted to the Raw brand, splitting them from Big E, who remained on the SmackDown brand. On the October 12 episode of Raw, New Day would exchange tag team titles with Raw Tag Team Championship holders The Street Profits, who were drafted to SmackDown. This would mark Kingston and Woods' third reign with the Raw titles as a team (fifth for Kingston individually), New Day's 10th tag team championship reign in WWE as a team, and Kingston's 13th tag team championship reign individually. On December 20, at TLC, Kingston and Woods lost the Raw Tag Team Championship to The Hurt Business (Cedric Alexander and Shelton Benjamin). In January 2021, Kingston stated that he was sidelined with a jaw injury. Kingston returned to the ring on the February 8 episode of Raw, teaming with Woods to defeat Retribution (T-Bar and Mace). At Elimination Chamber, Kingston competed in the WWE Championship Elimination Chamber match, eliminating Randy Orton, before being eliminated by Sheamus. On the March 15 episode of Raw, Kingston and Woods would defeat Cedric Alexander and Shelton Benjamin to win back the Raw Tag Team Championship, the New Day's 11th tag team championship, and Kingston's 14th individually. They would hold the championship until WrestleMania 37 where they lost the titles to AJ Styles and Omos.

On the May 17 episode of Raw, Kingston defeated Randy Orton, and then WWE Champion Bobby Lashley on the same night. The following week on Raw, he faced Drew McIntyre in a singles match with a stipulation in which the winner will face Lashley for the WWE Championship at Hell in a Cell, and the match ended in a no contest. A rematch between him and McIntyre was scheduled on Raw next week with the same stakes, where Kingston would lose. On the June 21 episode of Raw, Kingston interrupted Lashley and challenged him for the title, Lashley accepted and the match was scheduled for Money in the Bank. At the event, he lost the match.

As a part of the 2021 Draft, Kingston and Woods were drafted to the SmackDown brand. In October, Kingston entered the King of the Ring tournament, where he lost to Jinder Mahal in the first round. Woods, however, went on to win the King of the Ring tournament. Woods in turn changed his ring name to "King Woods", and he knighted Kingston as "Sir Kofi Kingston", the Hand of the King.Kingston and Woods then reignited their feud with The Usos, but would be defeated to them at WWE Day 1 and then again in a Street Fight on following SmackDown. In following weeks, Big E  would rejoin The New Day as they would start a new feud with Sheamus and Ridge Holland, but during a match Big E encountered a neck injury. Kingston and Woods eventually challenged Sheamus and Ridge Holland for a tag team match at WrestleMania 38 in a losing effort. They would then start a feud with returning Viking Raiders , who would brutally attack them. They would be unsuccessful in defeating Viking Raiders several times. They would then once again start a brief feud with The Usos as they wanted to defend their record of longest reigning tag team champions, however they were unsuccessful. They would make a surprise appearance on NXT in December challenging for NXT tag team championship.  New Day would win the match and the titles, giving them the Tag Team Triple Crown (Raw, SmackDown, and NXT Tag Team Championships), and making Kingston the first wrestler to have won both WWE's traditional Triple Crown and Tag Team Triple Crown. In the process, also, Kingston is the only person to have won the original World, Raw, SmackDown, and NXT Tag Team Championships.

Other media 
Kingston, under the nickname Mr. 24/7, frequently appears on fellow WWE wrestler, Xavier Woods' YouTube channel UpUpDownDown. In May 2019, he defeated UpUpDownDown Champion Gentleman Jack Gallagher in a game of Mortal Kombat 3 to win Gallagher's championship. Kingston lost the title one month later to Jey Uso in a game of Tetris.

In 2012, he guest-starred in an episode of Disney XD's karate sitcom Kickin' It. In 2016, he appeared with his New Day teammates on a Christmas Family themed Let's Make a Deal. In 2017, he published The Book of Booty: Shake It. Love It. Never Be It with fellow New Day members Big E and Xavier Woods. 

Along with Xavier Woods, Kingston appeared on episode #33 of Smosh Pit's, from the Smosh family on YouTube, Try Not to Laugh Series. The Smosh members joining them were: Ian Hecox, Shayne Topp, Damien Haas, and Mari Takahashi.

Film

Video games

Personal life 
Sarkodie-Mensah married Kori Campfield on September 11, 2010. Their son Kai was born in 2013. They welcomed another son, Orion Kingsley on April 28, 2016. Their daughter Lotus Selene was born on November 23, 2021. 

Sarkodie-Mensah's favorite wrestler growing up was Shawn Michaels. In a June 2019 interview, he stated that Dolph Ziggler was "one of my favorite opponents of all-time, if not my favorite. Not to toot my own horn or our horn, our matches have always been off the chain. We have really good chemistry."

Sarkodie-Mensah has tattoos of Ghanaian Adinkra symbols along his spine. His first name (Kofi) is the traditional name in Ghana for people born on a Friday.

Championships and accomplishments 

 CBS Sports
 Best Moment/Angle of the Year (2019) – 
 Pro Wrestling Illustrated
 Tag Team of the Year (2012) 
 Tag Team of the Year (2015, 2016) 
 Ranked No. 4 of the best 500 singles wrestlers in the PWI 500 in 2019
 Ranked No. 8 of the top 50 tag teams in the PWI Tag Team 50 in 2020 
 Sports Illustrated
 Ranked No. 9 of the top 10 male wrestlers in 2019
 Wrestling Observer Newsletter
 Best Gimmick (2015) – 
 WWE/World Wrestling Entertainment
 WWE Championship (1 time)
 WWE Intercontinental Championship (4 times)
 WWE United States Championship (3 times)
 WWE Raw Tag Team Championship (6 times) – with Evan Bourne (1), R-Truth (1), Big E and Xavier Woods (2) and Xavier Woods (2)
 WWE SmackDown Tag Team Championship (7 times) – with Big E and Xavier Woods (6) and Xavier Woods (1)
 World Tag Team Championship (1 time) – with CM Punk
NXT Tag Team Championship (1 time) – with Xavier Woods
 13th Grand Slam Champion (under current format; 20th overall)
 30th Triple Crown Champion (traditional format)
 Third Tag Team Triple Crown Champion – with Xavier Woods
 Bragging Rights Trophy (2010) – with Team SmackDown (Big Show, Rey Mysterio, Jack Swagger, Alberto Del Rio, Edge and Tyler Reks)
 WWE Intercontinental Championship Tournament (2010)
 WWE SmackDown Tag Team Championship Tournament (2018) – with Big E and Xavier Woods
 Slammy Award (2 times)
 "Tell Me I Did Not Just See That" Moment of the Year (2012) – 
 Ring Gear of the Year (2020) – with Big E and Xavier Woods
 WWE Year-End Award (2 times)
 Men's Tag Team of the Year (2019) – with Big E and Xavier Woods
 Moment of the Year (2019) –

Notes

References

External links 

 
 
 
 
Kofi Kingston Records at WWE NEWS

1981 births
21st-century professional wrestlers
African-American male professional wrestlers
American capoeira practitioners
American male professional wrestlers
American people of Ashanti descent
Boston College alumni
Expatriate professional wrestlers
Ghanaian emigrants to the United States
Ghanaian professional wrestlers
Living people
NWA/WCW/WWE United States Heavyweight Champions
People from Ashanti Region
Professional wrestlers from Florida
Professional wrestlers from Massachusetts
Sportspeople from Kumasi
WWF/WWE Intercontinental Champions
WWE Champions
WWE Grand Slam champions